Oleg Anatolyevich Samatov (born 20 June 1965) is a Russian professional football coach and a former player. He works as a conditioning coach with SKA-Khabarovsk.

Club career
He made his professional debut in the Soviet Second League in 1989 for FC Uralets Uralsk.

Honours
 Russian Premier League runner-up: 1994.
 Belarusian Premier League runner-up: 1999.
 Russian Cup winner: 1995.
 Soviet Cup finalist: 1990.

European club competitions
 UEFA Cup 1993–94 with FC Lokomotiv Moscow: 2 games.
 UEFA Cup 1994–95 with FC Dynamo Moscow: 4 games.
 UEFA Cup Winners' Cup 1995–96 with FC Dynamo Moscow: 6 games.

References

1965 births
Living people
People from Korolyov, Moscow Oblast
Soviet footballers
Russian footballers
Association football midfielders
Russian expatriate footballers
Expatriate footballers in Belarus
Russian Premier League players
FC Lokomotiv Moscow players
FC Dynamo Moscow players
FC Dynamo Stavropol players
FC Saturn Ramenskoye players
FC Slavia Mozyr players
Russian football managers
FC Sportakademklub Moscow players
Sportspeople from Moscow Oblast